Vale is a small settlement west of Gorjansko in the Municipality of Komen in the Littoral region of Slovenia on the border with Italy.

References

External links
Vale on Geopedia

Populated places in the Municipality of Komen